Wicked! is the third studio album by German band Scooter, released in 1996. It contains two singles, "I'm Raving", and "Break It Up".

Track listing
All tracks written by H.P. Baxxter, Rick J. Jordan, Jens Thele, and Ferris Bueller, except "I'm Raving" written by Marc Cohn; and "Don't Let It Be Me" and "Break It Up" written by Nosie Katzmann.

"Wicked Introduction" – 1:44
"I'm Raving"– 3:28
"We Take You Higher" – 4:22
"Awakening" – 4:26
"When I Was a Young Boy" – 3:58
"Coldwater Canyon" – 5:16
"Scooter Del Mar" – 4:58
"Zebras Crossing the Street" – 4:58
"Don't Let It Be Me" – 3:59
"The First Time" – 5:25
"Break It Up" – 3:39
Notes
"Wicked Introduction" is the tune of "Scotland the Brave". The next song, "I'm Raving", features samples of the same song, and also "Walking in Memphis" by Marc Cohn.
"When I Was A Young Boy" is based on The Loop!'s remix of the 1995 single "Babylon" by Prince Ital Joe Feat. Marky Mark. The Loop! was a remix project composed of H.P. Baxxter, Rick J. Jordan and Ferris Bueller.

Charts

References

1996 albums
Scooter (band) albums
Edel AG albums